The twenty-fourth series of the British medical drama television series Casualty commenced airing in the United Kingdom on BBC One on 12 September 2009, and concluded on 21 August 2010. Events of the series included a crossover with sister show Holby City.

Crew
The series was produced by the BBC and aired on BBC One in the United Kingdom. In April 2010, series production staff staged a protest at the Casualty studios over the dismissal of seven staff members from the show's props department. Media entertainment trade union BECTU claimed that the staff members were dismissed after 11 months and two weeks of service so that the BBC could avoid granting them rights allowed to employees who have worked for the company for a year or longer. Bectu supervisory official Helen Ryan stated: "This treatment of individuals would be unacceptable and immoral coming from any employer. However the fact this it is the BBC, a publicly funded and universally respected broadcaster will cause many to view the BBC in a new light." A petition against the decision was circulated, and BECTU representatives urged the dismissed employees to launch a formal appeal against the BBC.

Cast

Overview 
Casualty features an ensemble cast of characters in the medical profession, who work in the hospital's Emergency Department. In series 24, Tristan Gemmill, Michael French and Sunetra Sarker played consultants Adam Trueman, Nick Jordan and Zoe Hanna, Georgia Taylor appeared as doctor Ruth Winters, and Steven Miller (actor), Will Sharpe and Laura Aikman played F2s Lenny Lyons, Yuki Reid and May Phelps. Derek Thompson, Suzanne Packer and Ben Turner appeared as nurses Charlie Fairhead, Tess Bateman and Jay Faldren. Jane Hazlegrove, Matt Bardock and Sophia Di Martino played paramedics Kathleen "Dixie" Dixon, Jeff Collier and Polly Emmerson. Charles Dale appeared as hospital porter MacKenzie "Big Mac" Chalker, and Sam Grey played healthcare assistant Alice Chantrey. Chantrey departed from the show mid-series. Tony Marshall continued his role as receptionist Noel Garcia. Gillian Kearney played nurse Jessica Harrison from the beginning of the series until episode 24, "An Ugly Truth". Kearney briefly reprised her role for two episodes, "New Beginnings" and "A Better Past". Aikman also departed during the course of the series, resuming her role in episode 48, "What Tonight Means to Me – Part One". Lucy Gaskell was cast as new nurse Kirsty Clements.

The series featured several recurring characters, and numerous guest stars. Georgia Tennant appeared as new F2 doctor Heather. Joe McFadden played recurring homeless patient Alistair, who befriended Polly and appeared in Casualty first webisode, "The Parting of the Ways". Robert Boulter appeared as F2 Kieron Fletcher, Raymond Coulthard played anaesthetist Matt Strong, and Michael Maloney was consultant Howard Fairfax. Stephanie Beacham played Monica, an ardent feminist, who ended up in the ED after injuring herself on a light fitting, while Ron Moody starred as an elderly vagrant. Linda Robson featured as Louise, a single mother who discovers that her troublesome teenage son has bipolar disorder. Former Blue member Anthony Costa appeared as a man who doused his prostitute girlfriend with petrol. Barry Sloane played Davey Blake, a childhood friend of F2 Lenny Lyons (Steven Miller), and Chris Fountain appeared as Seb, a patient with leukaemia. Margaret John played a pensioner embarking on a relationship for the first time. Matthew Needham guest-starred in episode three, "And Then There Were Three", reprising his role as Toby De Silva. Mark Letheren played Toby's partner, hospital counsellor Ben Harding. Evelyn Hoskyns appeared as Shona Wark, the pregnant girlfriend of Charlie's son Louis (Gregory Foreman). Paul Bradley appeared as his Holby City character Elliot Hope as part of a crossover storyline. Brenda Fricker, an original Casualty character, reprised her role as Megan Roach as part of a guest story arc culminating with her character's death.

Main characters 

Laura Aikman as May Phelps (episodes 1−35 and 47)
Matt Bardock as Jeff Collier
Charles Dale as Big Mac
Sophia Di Martino as Polly Emmerson
Michael French as Nick Jordan (from episode 4)
Lucy Gaskell as Kirsty Clements (from episode 36)
Tristan Gemmill as Adam Trueman
Sam Grey as Alice Chantrey (until episode 34)
Jane Hazlegrove as Kathleen "Dixie" Dixon
Gillian Kearney as Jessica Harrison (until episode 23, episodes 34−35)
Tony Marshall as Noel Garcia
Steven Miller as Lenny Lyons (from episode 1)
Suzanne Packer as Tess Bateman
Sunetra Sarker as Zoe Hanna
Will Sharpe as Yuki Reid (from episode 1)
Georgia Taylor as Ruth Winters
Derek Thompson as Charlie Fairhead
Ben Turner as Jay Faldren

Recurring characters 

Stephen Billington as Edward Thurlow (from episode 38)
Robert Boulter as Kieron Fletcher (episodes 25−34)
Tom Chadbon as Henry Williams
Paul Copley as Arthur Dixon (episodes 23−30)
Raymond Coulthard as Matt Strong (episodes 25−34)
Richard Dillane as Sean Anderson (episodes 13−20)
Danny Emes as Lucas Anderson (until episode 23)
Miffy Englefield as Amelia Anderson (until episode 23)
Gregory Foreman as Louis Fairhead (episodes 12−25)
Evelyn Hoskins as Shona Wark (episodes 12−48)
Michael Maloney as Howard Fairfox (episodes 26−32)
Alec Newman as Robert Ludlow (episodes 36−48)

Guest characters 

Paul Bradley as Elliot Hope (episode 24)
Brenda Fricker as Megan Roach (episodes 43−46)
Mark Letheren as Ben Harding (episodes 3 and 25)
David Mallison as Eddie Lanchester (episodes 13−25)
Joe McFadden as Alistair (episodes 1−13)
Georgia Tennant as Heather Whitefield (episodes 1−2)
Matthew Needham as Toby De Silva (episode 3)
Christine Tremarco as Linda Andrews (episodes 20 and 23)

Episodes

Specials

Notes

References
General
BBC One - Casualty, Series 24
Specific

External links
 Casualty series 24 at the Internet Movie Database

24
2009 British television seasons
2010 British television seasons